Nofret was an ancient Egyptian king's wife who is so far only known from one stela that is today in the Egyptian Museum in Cairo. The stela was found at Abydos. The stela dates most likely to the 13th Dynasty and belongs to the commander of the ruler's crew {3tw n tt hq3}  Nedjesankh/Iu. His wife was the king's daughter Hatshepsut. The text states that the latter was born to the king's wife Nofret. Not much can be said about her. Her royal husband is not yet identified.

References 

18th-century BC women
Queens consort of the Thirteenth Dynasty of Egypt